is a Japanese politician of the Liberal Democratic Party (LDP), a member of the House of Representatives in the Diet (national legislature). A native of Higashiosaka, Osaka and graduate of Kansai University he was elected to the assembly of Osaka Prefecture for the first time in 1975. In 1993 he unsuccessfully ran for the House of Representatives as a member of the LDP. He ran again in 1996, this time as a member of the now-defunct New Frontier Party, and was elected for the first time. He later joined the LDP.

References

External links 
  in Japanese

1940 births
Living people
People from Higashiōsaka
Kansai University alumni
Members of the House of Representatives (Japan)
New Frontier Party (Japan) politicians
20th-century Japanese politicians
Liberal Democratic Party (Japan) politicians
21st-century Japanese politicians